Elen Feuerriegel is an Australian palaeoanthropologist, known for being one of the "underground astronauts" of the Rising Star Expedition. She is a researcher at the University of Washington.

Feuerriegel studied anthropology at the University of Queensland (BA, 2011) and the Australian National University (M. Biol. Anth, 2012). She then embarked on a PhD at ANU, under the supervision of Colin Groves, which she completed in 2017. Her thesis was on the biomechanics of the hominoid shoulder and its role in tool-making (flint knapping), and included research on Homo naledi fossils from Rising Star Cave.

In 2013, whilst a PhD student, Feuerriegel responded to an advertisement on Facebook calling for "skinny, highly-qualified paleontologists" with caving experience. The advertisement was placed by Lee Berger, who was recruiting a team to recover hominid fossils he had discovered in the difficult-to-access Dinaledi Chamber of Rising Star Cave. Feuerriegel helped excavate the fossils, which were subsequently assigned to a new species of human, Homo naledi. She also studied its upper limb bones.

Selected publications

References

External links 
 Elen Feuerriegel at the University of Washington

Year of birth missing (living people)
Living people
Australian paleoanthropologists
Australian women anthropologists
University of Queensland alumni
Australian National University alumni
University of Washington faculty